Neetho is a 2022 Indian Telugu-language romantic drama film directed by Balu Sharma and starring Aberaam Varma and Saathvika Raj.

Cast 

Aberaam Varma as Varun
Saathvika Raj as Meghna
Ravi Varma as Varun's colleague
Sunjiit Akkinepally as Varun's colleague
Rajiv Kanakala
Pavitra Lokesh
Thummala Narasimha Reddy
Neha Krishna
Kavya Raman
 Apoorva Srinivasan
 Mohit Baid
 Padmajaa El
 Gururaj Manepalli
 Sanjay Raichura
Snehal Jangala
 AVR Swamy
 CS Prakash
Sandeep Vijayvardhan
Krishna Mohan

Production 
Aberaam Varma plays an insurance agent and Saathvika Raj plays an independent woman. The film was shot in 2021.

Soundtrack 
The soundtrack was composed by Vivek Sagar.
"Lalanaa Madhura Kalana" – Hariharan (written by Varun Vamsi B)

Reception 
A critic from The Times of India wrote that "In a sea of love stories dished out every often, Neetho feels refreshing in its approach. Apart from some honest performances, well-shot frames and genre-encompassing soulful music form the movie's soul. Cinematography by Sundar Ram Krishnan, music direction by Vivek Sagar and background score by Smaran need a special mention. The makers fused multiple genres to create the required ambience. On the whole, Neetho is a modern take on love and relationships. Watch it for its tastefully crafted scenes laced with soulful music. However, its introspective monologues and philosophical dialogues might only appeal to niche audiences". A critic from OTT Play wrote that "Neetho explores several grey areas in modern-day relationships with maturity". A critic from 123telugu wrote that "The music by Vivek Sagar is pleasant to listen to, and a few songs are composed well. The cinematography is fine, and the office locations are showcased good. The production values are splendid. The editing should have been better, and the scenes should have been cut short. Coming to the director, Balu Sharma, he did a below-par job with his execution. His thought to deliver a simple and clean love story is appreciable but had he written the screenplay engagingly, the film would have been much better.".

References 

2020s Telugu-language films